Morris Plains is a NJ Transit station in Morris Plains, in Morris County, New Jersey, United States, along the Morristown Line at Route 202.

The former Lackawanna station was built in 1915 and has a brick station house. It was designed by architect Frank J. Nies who built other stations for the Delaware, Lackawanna and Western Railroad. Unlike most of his stations which tended to resemble massive cathedrals, Morris Plains station was built as a simple one-story structure, which also contains a unique Spanish tile roof. An old freight station just to the north now serves for a local model railroad club. The station was added to the National Register of Historic Places on June 22, 1984, along with over 100 other stations within the state as part of the Operating Passenger Railroad Stations Thematic Resource.

Station layout
The station has two tracks, each with a low-level side platform.

See also
National Register of Historic Places listings in Morris County, New Jersey

Bibliography

References

External links

 Littleton Road entrance from Google Maps Street View

NJ Transit Rail Operations stations
Railway stations in the United States opened in 1848
Former Delaware, Lackawanna and Western Railroad stations
Renaissance Revival architecture in New Jersey
Railway stations on the National Register of Historic Places in New Jersey
National Register of Historic Places in Morris County, New Jersey
1848 establishments in New Jersey
Railway stations in Morris County, New Jersey
Morris Plains, New Jersey